The Journal of Chinese Linguistics is a peer-reviewed academic journal in the field of linguistics, particularly concerned with all aspects of the Chinese language. It was established in 1973 and is now published twice a year by University of California at Berkeley. The current editor-in-chief is William S-Y. Wang (Chinese University of Hong Kong). According to the Journal Citation Reports, the journal has a 2011 impact factor of 0.179, ranking it 125th out of 162 journals in the category "Linguistics".

References

External links
 

Linguistics journals
Multilingual journals
Chinese-language journals
English-language journals
Biannual journals
Chinese studies journals
Publications established in 1973
Chinese University of Hong Kong